Ngoni is a Bantu language of Zambia, Tanzania, and Mozambique. There is a 'hard break' across the Tanzanian–Mozambican border, with marginal mutual intelligibility. It is one of several languages of the Ngoni people, who descend from the Nguni people of southern Africa, and the language is a member of the Nguni subgroup, with the variety spoken in Malawi sometimes referred to as a dialect of Zulu. Other languages spoken by the Ngoni may also be referred to as "Chingoni"; many Ngoni in Malawi, for instance, speak Chewa, and other Ngoni speak Tumbuka or Nsenga.

References

Languages of Tanzania
Ngoni language